"In My Lifetime" is the debut single by American rapper Jay-Z. It is produced by Ski and contains samples from "Oh Baby" by Aretha Franklin and two Soul II Soul songs: "Back to Life (However Do You Want Me)" and "Get a Life". The original white label version of the single was sold by Jay-Z and his friend Damon Dash out of Dash's car in 1994.

 It was originally released as a indie label release by Roc-A-Fella Records in 1994, but later re-released the single on Payday Records in 1995, but Jay-Z had royalty conflicts with the label and soon decided to grow Roc-A-Fella Records. The single features a remix by Big Jaz and the B-side, "Can't Get Wid That" produced by Clark Kent. The song is not featured on either of Jay-Z's first two albums, but the Big Jaz remix is featured on the Streets Is Watching soundtrack.

Formats and track listings

CD 
 "In My Lifetime (Big Jaz Radio Remix)" (4:18)
 "In My Lifetime (Original Ski Radio Version)" (4:10)
 "In My Lifetime (Skistrumental)" (4:28)
 "In My Lifetime (Big Jazmental Remix)" (4:05)

Vinyl

A-Side 
 In My Lifetime (Original Ski Radio Version) (4:10)
 In My Lifetime (Original Ski Street Version) (4:28)
 In My Lifetime (Ski instrumental) (4:28)

B-Side 
 In My Lifetime (Big Jaz Radio Remix) (4:48)
 In My Lifetime (Big Jazmental Remix) (4:05)
 Can't Get Wit That (DJ Clark Kent Version) (4:10)

Vinyl b/w "I Can't Get Wid Dat"

A-Side 
 "In My Lifetime"
 "In My Lifetime (Radio Edit)"
 "In My Lifetime (Instrumental)"

B-Side 
 "I Can't Get Wid Dat"
 "I Can't Get Wid Dat (Radio Edit)"
 "I Can't Get Wid Dat (Instrumental)"

References

See also 
List of songs recorded by Jay-Z

1995 songs
1995 debut singles
Jay-Z songs
Songs written by Jay-Z
Hardcore hip hop songs